WJKG, (105.5 FM), is a radio station licensed to Altamont, Illinois.  WJKG has a format known as 105.5 & 100.5 Jack FM and is owned by the Cromwell Radio Group.

References

External links

JKG
Radio stations established in 2013
2013 establishments in Illinois